The 2003 Houston Texans season was the franchise's second season in the National Football League and the second under head coach Dom Capers. It saw the Texans make a one-game improvement on its initial season's record.

Offseason

NFL draft

Staff

Roster

Preseason

Regular season

Schedule

Note: Intra-division opponents are in bold text.

Game summaries

Week 1: at Miami Dolphins

Week 2: at New Orleans Saints

Week 3: vs. Kansas City Chiefs

Week 4: vs. Jacksonville Jaguars

Week 6: at Tennessee Titans

David Carr threw for 371 yards and two touchdowns, but also threw three interceptions, including a pick six.

Week 7: vs. New York Jets

Week 8: at Indianapolis Colts

Week 9: vs. Carolina Panthers

Week 10: at Cincinnati Bengals

Week 11: at Buffalo Bills

On the Texans' third offensive drive, David Carr was sacked in his own end zone by Jeff Posey and fumbled the ball. The ball eventually went out of bounds in the end zone, resulting in a safety, giving the Bills a 2–0 lead. Carr was injured on the play and would be replaced by Tony Banks for the rest of the game. On the final play of the game, the Texans were facing a 4th and 14 at their own 34-yard line with 0:03 left to play up 12–8. The team lined up in a punt formation and Andre Johnson took the ball, intentionally running backwards to his own end zone and ran out of bounds for a safety with 0:00 on the clock, securing a 12–10 victory for the Texans.

Week 12: vs. New England Patriots

Week 13: vs. Atlanta Falcons

Week 14: at Jacksonville Jaguars

Week 15: at Tampa Bay Buccaneers

Week 16: vs. Tennessee Titans

Week 17: Indianapolis Colts

Standings

Statistics

Team

Individual

Source:

References

Houston Texans seasons
Houston